Doncho Zhekov (born 1 August 1952) is a Bulgarian wrestler. He competed in the men's freestyle 68 kg at the 1976 Summer Olympics.

References

1952 births
Living people
Bulgarian male sport wrestlers
Olympic wrestlers of Bulgaria
Wrestlers at the 1976 Summer Olympics
Sportspeople from Burgas